Tatsuko Ohsako (born 8 January 1952) is a Japanese professional golfer who played on the LPGA of Japan Tour (JLPGA) and the LPGA Tour.

Ohsako won 45 times on the LPGA of Japan Tour between 1975 and 1991. She was the leading money winner on the LPGA of Japan Tour three times (1977, 1980, 1987).

One of Ohsako's JLPGA wins was co-sanctioned with the LPGA Tour, the 1980 Mazda Japan Classic.

Ohsako finished fifth at the LPGA Tour's qualifying school tournament in January 1978 and played sparingly on the LPGA Tour from 1978 to 1984.

Professional wins (45)

LPGA of Japan Tour wins (45)
1975 (2) Japan Ladies Professional East vs. West, Matsushima Ladies Open
1977 (4) All-Star, Toyotomi Ladies, Mizuno Golf Tournament, Saikai National Park Ladies Open
1978 (4) Hokkaido Women's Open, Saikai National Park Ladies Open, Hokuriku Queens Cup, All-Star
1979 (3) Hiroshima Women's Open, Hokkaido Women's Open, Junon Women's Open
1980 (3) Northeast Queens, Japan LPGA Championship, Mazda Japan Classic (co-sanctioned with LPGA Tour)
1981 (2) Japan Women's Open, Tokai Classic
1982 (2) Hiroshima Women's Open, Japan Ladies Professional East vs West
1983 (4) Tokushima Tsukinomiya Ladies Classic Open, Fujisankei Ladies Classic, Canon Queens Cup, Japan LPGA Championship
1984 (4) Tohato Ladies, Japan Women's Open, Recruit Torabayu Cup, JLPGA Lady Borden Cup
1985 (5) Dunlop Ladies Open, Mizuno Open, Recruit Torabayu Cup, Kosaido Asahi Golf Cup, Tsumura Itsuki Classic
1986 (3) Kumamoto Chuo Ladies, Recruit Torabayu Cup, JLPGA Lady Borden Cup
1987 (4) Tohato Ladies, Hiroshima UCC Ladies, Toto Motors Ladies, Karuizawa 72 Tokyu Ladies Open
1988 (4) Tohato Ladies, UCC Ladies, Toto Motors Ladies, Japan LPGA Championship
1991 (1) Japan LPGA Championship

Tournament in bold denotes major championships on LPGA of Japan Tour.

LPGA Tour wins (1)

References

External links

Japanese female golfers
LPGA of Japan Tour golfers
LPGA Tour golfers
People from Miyazaki Prefecture
1952 births
Living people
20th-century Japanese women